Rune Lund (born 30 October 1976 in Copenhagen) is a Danish politician, who is a member of the Folketing for the Red–Green Alliance political party. He was elected at the 2015 Danish general election, and previously sat in parliament from 2005 to 2007.

Political career
Lund was first elected into parliament at the 2005 election. He was not reelected in 2007, but received enough votes to become the Red-Green Alliance's primary substitute in the Fyn constituency. In the 2015 election he received 530, but the Red-Green Alliance received enough overall votes for several levelling seats, one of which went to Lund. He was reelected in 2019 Danish general election with 1,157 votes, which was enough for a direct seat in parliament.

External links 
 Biography on the website of the Danish Parliament (Folketinget)

References

1976 births
Living people
Politicians from Copenhagen
Red–Green Alliance (Denmark) politicians
Members of the Folketing 2005–2007
Members of the Folketing 2015–2019
Members of the Folketing 2019–2022